Guren (紅蓮) is a Japanese word meaning "crimson-colored lotus" commonly encountered in the West when used in an artistic connotation. In Japan, Guren (紅蓮) is "crimson-colored (紅) lotus flower (蓮の花)". It is compared to the color of a flame of a burning fire. In Buddhist terminology, Guren is also an abbreviation for Guren Jigoku (紅蓮地獄), which is the seventh of The Eight Cold Hells. Those who fell here after death, it is said that the skin is torn due to severe cold, and the blood looks like a crimson-colored lotus flower. The 10th century  may have had a water jar of Guren in its right hand.

Derivation 

 Guren no idohori (紅蓮の井戸掘り): to dig well in Guren Jigoku (紅蓮地獄). This phrase means too much pain, distress, or example of suffering caused by the severe cold.
 Guren no yumiya  (紅蓮の弓矢, English: crimson-colored bow and arrow): This phrase is not accurate Japanese, precisely, there is no Japanese dictionary that explains this word. But from the meaning of Guren or Guren Jigoku, it seems that this phrase simply means 'bow and arrow with blood of shooter'. In other word, this word is creating an intention to counterattack despite any suffering or sacrifice.
 Guren no ～ ：This means 『～　of Guren 』 or 『Guren's～』. This phrase is used in many fields in Japan's subculture, lyrics, game, team name of Bōsōzoku (暴走族), anime, etc. But in formal occasions, the usage of this phrase is almost none.

References

Japanese words and phrases